Prince Yu of the First Rank, or simply Prince Yu, was the title of a princely peerage used in China during the Manchu-led Qing dynasty (1644–1912). As the Prince Yu peerage was not awarded "iron-cap" status, this meant that each successive bearer of the title would normally start off with a title downgraded by one rank vis-à-vis that held by his predecessor. However, the title would generally not be downgraded to any lower than a feng'en fuguo gong except under special circumstances.

The first bearer of the title was Fuquan (1653–1703), the Shunzhi Emperor's second son. In 1667, Fuquan was granted the title "Prince Yu of the First Rank" by his third brother, the Kangxi Emperor. The peerage was passed down over ten generations and held by 12 persons.

Members of the Prince Yu peerage

 Fuquan (1653 – 1703) (1st), the Shunzhi Emperor's second son, held the title Prince Yu of the First Rank from 1667 to 1703, posthumously honoured as Prince Yu Xian of the First Rank (裕憲親王)
 Baotai (保泰; 1682 – 1730) (2nd), Fuquan's third son, held the title Prince Yu of the First Rank from 1703 to 1724, stripped of his title in 1724
 Guangshan (廣善; 1697–1745), Baotai's eldest son, designated as Baotai's hereditary prince from 1722 to 1724, stripped of his heir apparent position and demoted to a grace defender duke in 1724, stripped of his title in 1728
 Baoshou (保綬; 1684–1706) (posthumously honoured), Fuquan's fifth son, posthumously honoured as Prince Yu Dao of the First Rank (裕悼親王) in 1725
 Guangning (廣寧; 1705–1739) (3rd), Baoshou's second son, held the title Prince Yu of the First Rank from 1724 to 1726, stripped of his title in 1726
 Guanglu (廣祿; 1706–1785) (4th), Baoshou's third son, held the title Prince Yu of the First Rank from 1726 to 1785, posthumously honoured as Prince Yu Zhuang of the First Rank (裕莊親王)
 Lianghuan (亮煥; 1740–1808) (5th), Guanglu's 12th son, held the title Prince Yu of the Second Rank from 1735 to 1808, posthumously honoured as Prince Yuxi of the Second Rank (裕僖郡王)
 Hengcun (恆存; 1762–1796) (posthumously honoured), Lianghuan's second son, posthumously honoured as a third-rank prince in 1808
 Wenhe (文和; 1781–1815) (6th), Hengcun's eldest son, held the title of a third-rank prince from 1808 to 1815
 Xiangduan (祥端; 1799–1836) (7th), Wenhe's eldest son, held the title of a fourth-rank prince from 1816 to 1836
 Wenjie (文傑; 1783–1834), Hengcun's second son, held the title of a grace general
 Xiangrui (祥瑞; 1807–1837), Wenjie's third son, held the title of a grace general
 Jishan (繼善; 1829–1861) (8th), Xiangrui's son and Xiangduan's heir, held the title of a grace defender duke from 1836 to 1861
 Rongyu (榮毓; 1846–1897) (9th), Jishan's eldest son, held the title of a grace defender duke from 1861 to 1897
 Kuizhang (魁璋; born 1894) (10th), Rongyu's eldest son, held the title of a grace defender duke
 Yuedi (岳棣; 1913–1935), Kuizhang's son
 Dasheng (達聲; born 1932), Yuedi's son

Cadet lines

Fuqian's line

 Changquan (昌全; 1676-1677), Fuquan's first son
 Zhansheng (詹升; 1678–1681), Fuquan's second son
 Bao'an (保安; 1683–1686), Fuquan's fourth son
 Baoyong (寶永; 1701–1705), Fuquan's sixth son

Family tree

See also
 Royal and noble ranks of the Qing dynasty

References
 

Qing dynasty princely peerages
Peerages of the Bordered White Banner